Bolesław Orliński (13 April 1899 – 28 February 1992) was a Polish aviator, military, sports and test pilot.

He was born on the family estate in Niwerka, Podolia (now Niverka, Kamianets-Podilskyi Raion, Khmelnytskyi Oblast, Ukraine). During World War I he was commissioned in the Russian Army, and fought in an infantry regiment on the German front, becoming an NCO. In 1918 he joined the newly formed Polish 1st Corps of Gen. Józef Dowbór-Muśnicki. When the corps was disarmed by the Germans in May 1918 he went to Ukraine and briefly served in the army of the Ukrainian People's Republic. He returned to Poland after independence and joined the Polish Army. He served in the cavalry during the Polish-Soviet war, and then volunteered for the air force.

He completed pilot training in Bydgoszcz and Grudziądz and in 1923 became an instructor in Grudziądz.

From 27 August to 25 September 1926, with mechanic Leon Kubiak, Orliński flew from Warsaw to Tokyo (10,300 km/6,400 miles) and back in a Breguet 19 A2. On the way back the plane was damaged by wind in Byrka and its left lower wing was broken and propeller was cracked. The Polish aviators shortened the opposite wing and repaired the propeller with glue and wire, and thus repaired flew the 6680 km to Warsaw. For the feat Orliński was awarded the Japanese Order of the Rising Sun 6th class, the French Legion of Honor and was promoted to captain.

In 1928 he quit the service and became a test pilot with the Polish PZL aviation works in Warsaw. He test-flew all PZL fighter prototypes, from the PZL P.1 designed by Zygmunt Puławski in 1928, through the PZL P.6, PZL P.7, PZL P.8, PZL P.11, PZL P.24 to PZL P.50 Jastrząb in 1939. He also tested the sports planes PZL.19, PZL.26, passenger planes PZL.4, PZL.44 Wicher, and liaison plane PZL Ł.2.

Apart from his test pilot work, he took part in numerous aviation contests and presentations of Polish aircraft abroad. Flying the PZL.5 he participated in the Challenge 1930 international touring planes contest, but failed to finish due to engine failure on 26 July. In December 1930 he presented the fighter PZL P.6 at the Paris Air Show. Flying the P.6, Orliński won the National Air Races in Cleveland from 29 August – 7 September 1931. Flying the PZL.19 he took part in the Challenge 1932 contest, but had to withdraw due to illness. On 28 June 1934 he set a world speed record for radial engined fighters of 414 km/h, flying the PZL P.24. During this time he survived several crashes and emergency parachute jumps.

After the outbreak of World War II and the German invasion on Poland, he volunteered for the Polish Army. On 8 September 1939, he was sent to Romania in preparation to receive British-built fighters. He subsequently reached Great Britain via Yugoslavia, Italy and France, where the remnants of the Polish Air Force were serving. Because of his age he could not be a fighter pilot and became an instructor. In 1943 he joined  No. 305 Polish Bomber Squadron, flying the de Havilland Mosquito fighter-bomber. From 1 August 1944 to 31 January 1945, Wing Commander Orliński was the commander of No. 305 Squadron. He flew 49 operational sorties, mostly at night. From 1 February 1945 until the end of the war in Europe, he was kept out of combat.

After the war, he decided not to return to Poland and settled in Toronto, Canada. During his career he flew 92 aircraft types and spent some 7,000 hours in the air. He died in Mississauga at the age of 92 and was buried in Poland.

Honours and awards
 Cross of Valour
 Gold Cross of Merit, twice
 Legion of Honour, Chevalier (France)
 Order of the Rising Sun, Jun class (Japan)
 Order of the Crown of Romania, Officer
 Silver Cross of the Virtuti Militari
 Air Force Medal 1939-45 (Medal Lotniczy) – four times
 Distinguished Flying Cross (United Kingdom)

1899 births
1992 deaths
Russian military personnel of World War I
Ukrainian military personnel
Polish people of the Polish–Soviet War
Polish Army officers
Polish aviation record holders
Polish aviators
Polish test pilots
Polish World War II pilots
Recipients of the Cross of Valour (Poland)
Recipients of the Gold Cross of Merit (Poland)
Chevaliers of the Légion d'honneur
Recipients of the Order of the Rising Sun
Officers of the Order of the Crown (Romania)
Recipients of the Silver Cross of the Virtuti Militari
Recipients of the Air Force Medal
Recipients of the Distinguished Flying Cross (United Kingdom)
Polish emigrants to Canada
People from Khmelnytskyi Oblast
People from Kamenets-Podolsky Uyezd
People from the Russian Empire of Polish descent